HMS Greyhound was a 50-gun fourth rate ship of the line of the Royal Navy, built at Ipswich and launched in 1702. Her name is alternatively spelt Greyhond.

Greyhound served until 1711, when she was wrecked.

Notes

References

Lavery, Brian (2003) The Ship of the Line - Volume 1: The development of the battlefleet 1650-1850. Conway Maritime Press. .

Ships of the line of the Royal Navy
1700s ships
Ships built in Ipswich